Jorge Alves may refer to:

Jorge Alves (ice hockey) (born 1979), American ice hockey goaltender
Jorge Alves (volleyball) (born 1978), Portuguese volleyball player in 2002 FIVB Volleyball Men's World Championship squads
Jorge Alves (footballer) (born 1996), East Timorese player in the Timor-Leste 2012 Hassanal Bolkiah Trophy squad
Jorge Alves (Cape Verdean footballer)

See also
Jorge Alves Barcelos
Jorge Alves da Silva